General West may refer to:

Absolom M. West (1818–1894), Confederate States Army brigadier general
Clement West (1892–1972), British Army major general
Francis H. West (1825–1896), Union Army brevet brigadier general
John West, 1st Earl De La Warr (1693–1766), 1st Troop of Horse Guards General of the Horse
John West, 2nd Earl De La Warr (1729–1777), British Army lieutenant general
Joseph R. West (1822–1898), Union Army brigadier general and brevet major general
Michael West (British Army officer) (1905–1978), British Army general
Nadja West (born 1961), U.S. Army lieutenant general
W. Thomas West (born 1943), U.S. Air Force major general
William West (Rhode Island politician) (c. 1733–1816), Continental Army brigadier general in the American Revolutionary War

See also
Major General West, fictional character in the Stargate SG-1 universe
Attorney General West (disambiguation)